Everything, Everything is a live album by Underworld, released 4 September 2000 on Junior Boy's Own. The album is named after the lyrics in one of the songs, "Cowgirl".

A companion DVD was released separately soon after the album's release. The DVD features live footage of the band mixed with videography and artistic effects by the design group Tomato, with Jono Griffith of Ernest Edits as 'Creative Editor'. The DVD also features several songs not on the album – "Moaner", "Puppies", "Kittens", and "Rowla".

Reception
Select gave the album a four out of five rating, stating that "like most live LPs this is ultimately an artefact for fans rather than newcomers, but it's quite some artefact".

Track listing

CD
All songs by Underworld unless noted
"Juanita / Kiteless" – 12:35
"Cups" – 3:26
"Push Upstairs" – 7:28
"Pearl's Girl" – 8:17
"Jumbo" – 8:33
"Shudder/King of Snake" (Bellotte/Moroder/Summer/Underworld) – 12:17
"Born Slippy .NUXX" – 10:56
"Rez / Cowgirl" – 11:47

DVD
"Opening Credits" – 0:38
"Intro" – 0:21
"Juanita / Kiteless" – 11:36
"Cups" – 3:26
"Push Upstairs" – 7:28
"Pearl's Girl" – 8:17
"Jumbo" – 8:33
"Shudder/King of Snake" (Bellotte/Moroder/Summer/Underworld) – 12:17
"Born Slippy .NUXX" – 10:56
"Rez / Cowgirl" – 11:47
"Moaner" – 8:45
"Ending Credits" – 4:29 (features an instrumental of the song "Puppies" from the "Pearl's Girl" single)

Bonus Tracks
The bonus tracks are presented with a slideshow of monochromatic patterns.
"Kittens" – 8:47
"Rowla" – 7:48
"Outtakes" – 3:57

Personnel
Tommy Morrison	 – 	assistant engineer
Darren Emerson	 – 	programming
Karl Hyde	 – 	vocals, guitar, programming
Mike Nielsen	 – 	engineer, mixing
Rick Smith	 – 	programming, producer
John Coulling	 – 	technical assistance
Robin Kelly	 – 	technical assistance
Will Shapland	 – 	engineer
Ian Sylvester	 – 	consultant
Colin Birch	 – 	technical assistance
Rob Buckler	 – 	technical assistance
Phil Dore	 – 	spoken word
Mike Gillespie	 – 	project coordinator
Murray Harris	 – 	consultant
Stuart Kelling	 – 	spoken word
Ollie Meacock	 – 	mastering, assistant engineer
Tim Shaxson	 – 	technical assistance
Stuart Thomas	 – 	technical assistance

Charts

References

Underworld (band) albums
Live video albums
2000 live albums
2000 video albums
V2 Records live albums
V2 Records video albums